The 1988 African Cup of Nations Final was a football match that took place on 27 March 1988 at the Stade Mohamed V in Casablanca, Morocco to determine the winner of the 1988 African Cup of Nations. Cameroon defeated Nigeria 1–0 with a lone goal from Emmanuel Kundé in the 55th minute.

Road to the final

Match

Details

External links
Final match details - 11v11.com
Qualifications details - RSSSF

Final
1988
1988
1988
1988 in Cameroonian football
1987–88 in Nigerian football
March 1988 sports events in Africa
20th century in Casablanca